Mansergh is a civil parish in the South Lakeland District of Cumbria, England. It contains 14 listed buildings that are recorded in the National Heritage List for England.  All the listed buildings are designated at Grade II, the lowest of the three grades, which is applied to "buildings of national importance and special interest".  The parish contains the small village of Mansergh, and is otherwise almost completely rural.  The listed buildings consist of houses and associated structures, farm buildings, a milestone, a former school, and a church.


Buildings

Notes and references

Notes

Citations

Sources

Lists of listed buildings in Cumbria